Crush, Kill, Destroy is the second EP released by the Brazilian extreme metal band, Sarcófago. It was released only in Brazil. All of the tracks on this EP can be found on The Laws of Scourge.

Track listing

Tracks 3 and 4 are remastered versions of those appearing on The Laws of Scourge.

Line up
 Wagner Lamounier - lead vocals, rhythm guitar
 Fabio Jhasko - lead guitar
 Gerald Minelli - bass guitar, acoustic guitar 
 Lucio Olliver - drums, percussion

References

Sarcófago albums
1992 EPs